Euspinolia militaris is a species of wasp in the family Mutillidae. Though it is a wingless wasp, it has sometimes been referred to by the name panda ant.

Description 
This species was discovered in 1938, and inhabits the Chilean sclerophyll forests. It has been referred to as the "panda ant" due to its coloration; with white coat covering all of its head except the eyes, and black and white spots appearing over the rest of its body. The coloration is aposematic, serving as a warning to predators of its painful and powerful sting. Females are wingless and males have wings. They measure up to 8 millimeters in length.

Biology 
Euspinolia militaris are solitary ectoparasites of mature larvae or pre-pupae of other insects, as is true of other mutillids, with females using the ovipositor to insert eggs into host brood cells, and for stinging (for defense). The color patterns of a female wasp is what helps the male wasp differentiate between another male and a female. Like other mutillids, during mating the males are presumed to lift females and proceed to mate while airborne.  After mating, the female wasp goes underground to a bee or wasp nest where the larvae from the growing Panda Ant, eats off of the host and eventually kills it.

Stridulation 
This species produces sound in response to threats from potential predators via stridulation, as do other mutillids, though this species is unusual in having a strong ultrasonic component to the sounds it produces. Compared to other mutillids studied, the distress stridulation emitted by E. militaris has a larger number of pulses and a longer duration in the forward notes. Furthermore, its chirp durations and repetition intervals are longer and emitted at lower rates.

References 

Mutillidae
Hymenoptera of South America
Insects described in 1938